Caladenia arrecta, commonly known as the reaching spider orchid, is a plant in the orchid family Orchidaceae and is endemic to the south-west of Western Australia. It is distinguished from the similar C. longiclavata and C. magniclavata by its upswept petals and distinctive calli. Although not common, it is widespread in south-eastern coastal areas.

Description
The dorsal sepal is erect and the lateral sepals have prominently clubbed, glandular ends pointing obliquely downwards. The petals are also clubbed but spread upwards. The labellum is red with fringes of pointed calli and two pairs of rows of deep red calli along its centre. Flowering occurs between late July and mid-October.

Taxonomy and naming
Caladenia arrecta was first formally described by Stephen Hopper and Andrew Brown in 2001 from a specimen collected near Bindoon. The description was published in Nuytsia and the specific epithet (arrecta) is a Latin word meaning "upright", in reference to the upright petals.

Distribution and habitat
Reaching spider orchid occurs in scattered locations between Esperance and Bindoon in the Avon Wheatbelt, Esperance Plains, Jarrah Forest, Mallee, Swan Coastal Plain and Warren biogeographic regions where it grows in a variety of soils and habitats.

Conservation
Caladenia arrecta is classified as "Not Threatened" by the Western Australian Government Department of Parks and Wildlife.

References

arrecta
Endemic orchids of Australia
Orchids of Western Australia
Plants described in 2001
Taxa named by Stephen Hopper
Taxa named by Andrew Phillip Brown